Oscar Meza (born December 5, 1986 in El Dorado, Sinaloa, Mexico) is a Mexican professional boxer in the Light Welterweight division.

Pro career
On September 12, 2009 Meza lost to the Mexican American Brandon Rios in Buffalo Bill's Star Arena, Primm, Nevada.

Oscar lost to Mercito Gesta and his chance at the vacant WBO NABO Youth Lightweight Championship, in A La Carte Event Pavilion, Tampa, Florida.

He is also an audio engineer.

References

External links

Boxers from Sinaloa
Lightweight boxers
1986 births
Living people
Mexican male boxers